Dinan (also Romanized as Dīnān; also known as Ākhā) is a village in Bala Larijan Rural District, Larijan District, Amol County, Mazandaran Province, Iran. As of its 2006 census, its population was 77 across 24 families.

References 

Populated places in Amol County